Nell Gwyn is a 1926 British silent romance film directed by Herbert Wilcox and starring Dorothy Gish, Randle Ayrton and Juliette Compton. It was based on the 1926 novel Mistress Nell Gwyn by Marjorie Bowen and follows the life of Nell Gwynne, the mistress of Charles II. Wilcox later made a second version of the film in 1934, Nell Gwynn which starred Anna Neagle.

Plot
As described in a film magazine review, Nell Gwyn is first seen as an orange girl at the Old Drury Theatre in London. She attracts the eye of the King and he makes her one of the players at His Majesty's Theatre. She succeeds and winning the King's affection becomes his favorite, vieing with Lady Castlemaine for his favors. Through her efforts, a palace which he is building for her is converted into a home for disabled soldiers and sailors. When his hour of death nears, the King dies in her arms, with her name on his lips.

Cast
 Dorothy Gish as Nell Gwyn
 Randle Ayrton as Charles II
 Juliette Compton as Lady Castlemaine
 Sydney Fairbrother as Mrs. Gwyn 
 Donald Macardle as Duke of Monmouth 
 Johnny Butt as Samuel Pepys
 Gibb McLaughlin as Duke of York
 Judd Green as Toby Clinker 
 Edward Sorley as Dickon 
 Forrester Harvey as Charles Hart 
 Fred Rains as Earl of Shaftesbury 
 Rolf Leslie as Evelyn 
 Aubrey Fitzgerald as Tom Killigrew 
 Tom Coventry as Innkeeper 
 Booth Conway as Messenger 
 Dorinea Shirley as Maid

Production
Wilcox said he got the idea to make the film after making The Only Way. He saw a theatre bill headlined by "Dolly Elswrothy" and remembered a sketch he saw where Elsworthy played Nell Gwyn. He cabled to see if Dorothy Gish was available and she accepted.

Dorothy Gish was paid £7,000 (£1,000 a week plus expenses). Wilcox arranged to finance the film with an accountant, everyone contributing half. Wilcox says the accountant reneged and he had to finance the film entirely himself. To save money  he edited the fim himself

One report says the film was made for £20,000 and Wilcox sold it outright for £35,000. Wilcox says it was made for £14,000 and he sold it for £20,000. The company that bought it was British National Pictures.

Reception

Critical
The New York Times wrote, "Whatever may be the shortcomings of English motion picture producers. If they can put together other pictures as simply and with as much dramatic effect as this story of Nell Gwyn they should have no difficulty obtaining a showing for them anywhere. The story moves quickly and surely, with nothing to strain one's credulity, and the acting of Miss Gish and Randie Ayrton, who takes the part of Charles, is excellent. So is that of Juliette Compton as Lady Castlemaine. The immorality of the period is suggested without being offensive, and for the second time this Summer a good picture has not been spoiled by prudery. The titles are unusually good and frequently amusing, that dear old gossip Pepys being resorted to for purposes of verisimilitude."

Box office
Wilcox says the film "was a riotous success throughout the world." It was sold to the US for £28,000.

It did so well that British National Films signed Wilcox and Gish to make three more films together, which would be financed by Paramount.

References

Bibliography
 Street, Sarah. Transatlantic crossings: British feature films in the United States. Continuum International Publishing, 2002.

External links

1926 films
1920s biographical films
1920s historical romance films
British biographical films
1920s English-language films
Films directed by Herbert Wilcox
Films set in the 1660s
Films set in the 1670s
Films set in the 1680s
Films set in London
Nell Gwyn
British silent feature films
British black-and-white films
British historical romance films
Films based on biographies
Cultural depictions of Charles II of England
Cultural depictions of Barbara Palmer, 1st Duchess of Cleveland
1920s British films
Silent historical romance films